Magomed Dzhafarov (born 18 June 1976) is a Russian judoka.

Achievements

References

External links
 
 

1976 births
Living people
Russian male judoka
Judoka at the 2004 Summer Olympics
Olympic judoka of Russia
Universiade medalists in judo
Universiade gold medalists for Russia
20th-century Russian people
21st-century Russian people